Ellen Marguerite Tuckey (1884–1939) was one of the first three women to enter Trinity College, Dublin in 1904 with Avarina Shegog after Marion Johnston.

Biography
Ellen, or Elsie as she was also known, was born on the 4 February 1884 to Ellen Elizabeth Orpen and Davys Tuckey, barrister-at-law, and Assistant Land Commissioner in Dublin city. She had two brothers, Charles Orpen Tuckey and Arthur Davys Tuckey. She was educated in Trinity College Dublin, joining Marion Johnston in the summer term in 1904.

She graduated with a B.A., Senior Moderator in Literature, in 1907. She went on to gain the teaching diploma and spent time studying in Bryn Mawr College in the United States. Tuckey taught for several years in both India and Canada before returning to Dublin to become Head Mistress of the Masonic Female Orphan School of Ireland, Ballsbridge, Dublin.

She died unexpectedly aged 56 on 22 May 1939.

References

People from Ballsbridge
Irish women's rights activists
Alumni of Trinity College Dublin
1884 births
1939 deaths
Irish women academics